Yajnaseni: the story of Draupadi is a 1984 Odia language novel by Pratibha Ray. The story revolves around Draupadi from the famous epic Mahabharatha. The word Yajnaseni means a woman born out of fire. The book has been translated into various languages, including English, Hindi, Malayalam, Kannada,
Marathi, Assamese, Bengali, Nepali and Hungarian.

This novel has been rendered into a theatrical play in Nepali by Suman Pokhrel.

Awards 
 Sarala Award, 1990
 Moortidevi Award, 1991

References

External links 

http://indiatoday.intoday.in/story/odia-writer-pratibha-ray-named-for-jnanpith-award/1/239724.html
http://www.zapondo.com/book-review-yajnaseni-by-pratibha-ray

Novels based on the Mahabharata
1984 Indian novels
Novels adapted into plays